International Social Security Review is a quarterly peer-reviewed academic journal published by Wiley-Blackwell on behalf of the International Social Security Association. The journal was established in 1967. The journal is published in English, French, German and Spanish and includes studies of social security systems in different countries. Topics covered include pensions, insurance, employment, and public benefits.

External links 
 

Wiley-Blackwell academic journals
Multilingual journals
Publications established in 1967
Quarterly journals
Sociology journals